Christopher Philip Eaton (born 27 November 1987) is a British retired tennis player. He reached his career-high singles ranking of World No. 317 in June 2009, and his career-high doubles ranking of World No. 147 in May 2011. Eaton is currently the assistant coach at Wake Forest University.

In February 2009, Eaton played what was then the longest tennis match in history, lasting 6 hours and 40 minutes, eventually beating James Ward 21–19 in the fifth set. This was a playoff match to decide the Davis Cup team, but it was not sanctioned by the ATP, so was not an official record, and it was later broken.

Early and personal life
He learned to play tennis at Reed's School. He was nicknamed the "Eaton Rifle" due to his big serve.

From age 8 to 16, he was coached by Justin Sherring.

Junior career
Eaton reached a career high of No. 97 in April 2005 at age 17. In his only singles main draw junior grand slam match, and his final match as a junior, he lost to Donald Young at Wimbledon in 2005, 1–6, 5–7.

Senior career

2007
Eaton's best results in 2007 were two Futures championships in doubles in Israel and Great Britain,
and a singles semifinal appearance in Israel F4 in November, where he beat No. 839 Amir Hadad.
He finished 2007 ranked No. 656 in singles play.

2008

Eaton made little singles progress in the first 4 months of the year. However, he had much success in doubles,
making the doubles finals of 5 Futures and winning two of them.

In June, he had a breakthrough singles win in the 2nd round of qualifying at Nottingham, beating his first top-100 opponent, No. 90 Guillermo García López, before losing to No. 111 Vince Spadea in the final qualifying round. He followed that up the next week as a wild card by qualifying in singles for the Wimbledon Championships, beating No. 140 Mikhail Kukushkin, No. 206 Jan Minář, and No. 162 Olivier Patience, scoring 32 aces in that match. He was also given a wild card into the main doubles draw with Alexander Slabinsky.

In the Wimbledon Championships first round he beat Serbia's Boris Pasanski 6–3 7–6(8–6) 6–4. He then faced Russia's Dmitry Tursunov, the number 25 seed in the second round on Court One, his first show-court appearance. However, he could not continue his winning streak and Eaton lost 6–7(2), 2–6, 4–6. As a result of his performance at Wimbledon, Eaton's ranking rose to a career high of 386. This made him eligible for Challenger events.

2009

Having played little more than a few Futures at the start of the year, Eaton was thrust into play-offs, between six British tennis hopefuls, designed by John Lloyd to help pick the two singles players to represent Great Britain in the Euro/Africa Zone Group I tie against Ukraine.

Eaton started well, defeating Alexander Slabinsky 6–4 6–4 2–6 7–6 (7–5). He then beat James Ward 6–3 6–2 6–7 (3–7) 2–6 21–19 in a gruelling match lasting six hours and 40 minutes, making it the longest match in history prior to the epic Isner-Mahut match at the 2010 Wimbledon Championships. Lloyd had decided he had seen enough, and chose Eaton and Joshua Goodall as the two players to represent Britain alongside Colin Fleming and Ross Hutchins.

Eaton lost his first Davis Cup match 6–3, 3–6, 6–3, 6–4 to Ukrainian number 1 Sergiy Stakhovsky but managed to restore some pride to Team GB, who were on the verge of a whitewash before Eaton managed to beat Illya Marchenko 6–3, 4–6, 7–6 in the remaining dead rubber. Despite putting in one of the better performances by British players other than Andy Murray in the Davis Cup recently, Eaton didn't appear in the plans of captain John Lloyd for forthcoming fixtures.

2010
At Wimbledon Eaton and doubles partner Dominic Inglot defeated the defending champions Daniel Nestor and Nenad Zimonjic in the second round, to achieve his best Slam result with a third round appearance.

Eaton began playing touchtennis as a pastime against other former professional tennis players as well as current park players and rank amateurs. He has won one title and hosted a weekly tennis phone in show on the sports website.

Eaton played his last match in the 2012 Wimbledon qualifying second round. He joined the Wake Forest men's tennis staff as an assistant coach in the 2016–17 season.

He coaches doubles player Henri Kontinen.

ATP Challenger and ITF Futures finals

Singles: 4 (3–1)

Doubles: 38 (23–15)

References

External links
 
 
 

1987 births
Living people
English male tennis players
Sportspeople from Guildford
People educated at Reed's School
British male tennis players
Tennis people from Surrey